Peter J. Smith (August 22, 1867 – April 2, 1947) was a member of the Wisconsin State Senate.

Biography
Smith was born on August 22, 1867 in Denmark. In 1888, he married Ann Marie Lassen, they had five children. Smith died on April 2, 1947 in Eau Claire, Wisconsin.

Career
Smith was elected to the Senate in 1928 and served until 1933. Additionally, he was an Eau Claire alderman and a member of the Eau Claire County, Wisconsin Board, as well as Chairman of the Eau Claire County Republican Party and a delegate to the 1924 Republican National Convention. Smith also served as grand secretary of the Scandinavian-American Fraternity.

References

External links

Danish emigrants to the United States
Politicians from Eau Claire, Wisconsin
County supervisors in Wisconsin
Republican Party Wisconsin state senators
Wisconsin city council members
1867 births
1947 deaths